Richard Elual Kerrin  (4 July 1898 – 4 November 1988) was Dean of Aberdeen and Orkney from 1956  to 1969.

The son of a clergyman, he was educated at Robert Gordon's College and the University of Aberdeen. After wartime service with the Artists' Rifles he was  ordained in 1923. Following a curacy at  Old Saint Paul's, Edinburgh he held Incumbencies at Inverurie,  Stirling and  Fraserburgh He then served as Rector of St John's Aberdeen from 1954 to 1969 during which he was appointed as Dean of the Diocese between 1954 and 1969.  After retirement from the full-time ministry, he served at Alford until ill-health forced him to retire permanently.

Notes

1898 births
1988 deaths
People educated at Robert Gordon's College
Alumni of the University of Aberdeen
Artists' Rifles soldiers
British Army personnel of World War I
Alumni of Edinburgh Theological College

Deans of Aberdeen and Orkney